Babu Ram Mandial is an Indian politician and member of the Bharatiya Janata Party. Mandial was a member of the Himachal Pradesh Legislative Assembly from the Nadaun constituency in Hamirpur district.

References 

People from Hamirpur district, Himachal Pradesh
Bharatiya Janata Party politicians from Himachal Pradesh
Himachal Pradesh MLAs 1998–2003
Living people
21st-century Indian politicians
Himachal Lokhit Party politicians
Year of birth missing (living people)